{{Automatic taxobox
| taxon = Cominellidae
| image = Pareuthria atrata (MNHN-IM-2000-1035).jpeg
| image_caption = Shell of Pareuthria atrata
| authority = Gray, 1857
| synonyms_ref = 
| synonyms = 
| type_genus= Cominella Gray, 1850
| subdivision_ranks = Genera
| subdivision = See text
}}

The Cominellidae are taxonomic family of large sea snails in the superfamily Buccinoidea.

Genera
 Cominella Gray, 1850
 Falsitromina Dell, 1990
 Lusitromina Harasewych & Kantor, 2004
 Pareuthria Strebel, 1905
 Parficulina'' Powell, 1958

References

 Kantor, Y.I., Fedosov, A.E., Kosyan, A.R., Puillandre, N., Sorokin, P.A., Kano, Y., Clark, R. & Bouchet, P. (2021). Molecular phylogeny and revised classification of the Buccinoidea (Neogastropoda). Zoological Journal of the Linnean Society. DOI: 10.1093/zoolinnean/zlab031: 1-69

External links
 Gray, J. E. (1857). Guide to the systematic distribution of Mollusca in the British Museum. Part I. (Gastropoda). British Museum, London, xii + 230 pp

Buccinoidea